Adnan Jaffar is a Pakistani actor and former anchor from Karachi. 

He is known for his work in theatre, film and television industry of Pakistan for which he is extensively appreciated.

Career
Adnan began his career after attending National Academy of Performing Arts and Arizona State University. 

A mass communication graduate, before taking on acting, he was for some time a broadcast journalist for Dawn News. 

He made his film debut in 2015 in Jalaibee followed by Manto (2015), Moor (2015) and Jeewan Hathi (2016). Apart from films, he has also appeared in television series such as Coke Kahani, Jackson Heights and Behadd. Adnan also appeared in Chupan Chupai (2017), Parwaaz Hay Junoon (2017) and Project Ghazi (2018).

Filmography

Television

References

External links 
 
 Adnan Jaffar on Facebook

Pakistani male television actors
Pakistani male film actors
Living people
1974 births
Male actors from Karachi
National Academy of Performing Arts alumni